Henley College may refer to:

 Henley College Coventry, a further education college in Coventry, West Midlands
 The Henley College (Henley-on-Thames), a sixth form college in Henley-on-Thames, Oxfordshire 
 Henley Management College, South Africa, a campus of the Henley Business School

See also
 Henley (disambiguation)
 Henley High School (disambiguation)